The Gosforth Cross is a large stone monument in St Mary's churchyard at Gosforth in the English county of Cumbria, dating to the first half of the 10th century AD. Formerly part of the kingdom of Northumbria, the area was settled by Scandinavians some time in either the 9th or 10th century. It has gained reputation for its combination of Christian symbols with Nordic symbols, being a tangible piece of evidence of the impact of the Christianization of Scandinavia.

Description
The Gosforth Cross has elaborate carvings which have been interpreted as representing characters and scenes from Norse mythology, similarly to how the Jelling stones in Denmark depict Jesus with other Norse mythological characters. Its design is modelled after the cross design that originated during the Christianization of Ireland. The Gosforth Cross was first identified in 1886 by the amateur antiquarian Charles Arundel Parker in his book The Ancient Crosses at Gosford and Cumberland. He demonstrated that the cross showed scenes described in the Poetic Edda. Those include images identified as:

 Loki bound with his wife Sigyn protecting him.
 The god Heimdallr holding his horn.
 The god Víðarr tearing the jaws of Fenrir.
 Thor's failed attempt to catch Jörmungandr, the Midgard Serpent.

It is currently debated amongst scholars whether the sources were added to the Cross out of reverence for Viking beliefs and still clinging to their own identity or as a way to parallel Norse mythology (ie Ragnarök, the death of Baldr) with Christian beliefs (ie the Apocalypse, the crucifixion of Christ). Among the parallels is Loki being bound is allegorical for Satan being bound, the death of Baldr accompanied by Hod and Nanna interchangeable with Christ's death as witnessed by Longinius and Mary Magdalene, and the battle Odin has with Surtr similar to how Christ ultimately conquers the Devil.

Another is how the base of the cross has a tree-like design, looking like bark. This is a possible parallel between Yggsdrasil and the Tree of Life; both featured heavily in their respective mythologies.

The cross also has Christian symbolism, including a depiction of the crucifixion of Christ. The combination of Christian and Norse pagan symbolism on the cross may be evidence of the use of pagan stories to illustrate Christian teachings. Christ here is depicted as a deity of power, hence why he is absent on the cross on the tip. He was popularly interpreted as a deity of power amongst Viking culture.

It is estimated to date from 920–950 and is still in fairly good condition. Its design shows a strong Anglo-Saxon influence and suggests that the carvers were heavily influenced by Anglo-Saxon stone carving. The importance of the Gosforth Cross (as well as the Irton Cross) caused the Victoria and Albert Museum to have replicas made in 1882, which are on display in the Cast Hall at the museum. In 1887, the Rev. William Slater Calverley commissioned a replica life-sized copy of this cross and erected it in the churchyard at Aspatria, Cumbria.

The church also has important hogback tombs, and what appears to be a fragment of another cross, showing the god Thor fishing.

Galleries
The following images depict the 10th-century Gosforth Cross and related artefacts at St Mary's church. The images were published by Finnur Jónsson in Goðafræði Norðmanna og Íslendinga eftir Heimildum in 1913, and the identifications of the figures are those suggested by Jónsson in 1913.

Other Images

Notes

References
Arundel P Charles, The Ancient crosses at Gosforth and Cumberland, Elliot Stock, 1896
 
 
 Finnur Jónsson (1913). Goðafræði Norðmanna og Íslendinga eftir heimildum. Reykjavík: Hið íslenska bókmentafjelag.

External links

 Film about the Gosforth Cross
 "Four sides of the Gosforth Cross"
 Megalithic Portal
 Gosforth Cross

Anglo-Norse England
Anglo-Saxon art
Archaeological sites in Cumbria
High crosses in England
History of Cumberland
Monumental crosses in England
Sculptures depicting the Crucifixion of Jesus
Thor in art
Gosforth, Cumbria
Loki